The 2016 Portuguese Social Democratic Party leadership election was held on 5 March 2016. Then PSD leader and former Prime Minister Pedro Passos Coelho ran for a 4th term as party leader and was the sole candidate in the race, thus winning with more than 90% of the votes.

Candidates

Results

See also
 Social Democratic Party (Portugal)
 List of political parties in Portugal
 Elections in Portugal

References

External links
PSD Official Website

2016 in Portugal
Political party leadership elections in Portugal
2016 elections in Portugal
Portuguese Social Democratic Party leadership election
March 2016 events in Portugal